Yevgeny Ivanovich Penyayev (born 16 May 1942) is a retired Russian sprint canoer. He won a bronze medal in the C-1 1000 m event at the 1964 Olympics finishing 0.42 seconds behind the second place.

References

1942 births
Canoeists at the 1964 Summer Olympics
Living people
Soviet male canoeists
Olympic canoeists of the Soviet Union
Olympic bronze medalists for the Soviet Union
Olympic medalists in canoeing
Russian male canoeists

Medalists at the 1964 Summer Olympics